R and W Hawthorn Ltd was a locomotive manufacturer in Newcastle upon Tyne, England, from 1817 until 1885.

Locomotive building
Robert Hawthorn first began business at Forth Bank Works in 1817, building marine and stationary steam engines. In 1820, his brother William joined him and the firm became R and W Hawthorn. Possibly after having attended the Rainhill Trials in 1829, they became interested in locomotives, and sold their first engine in 1831. Printed and online sources claim this to be Mödling for the Vienna Gloggnitz railway. That is wrong, that locomotive was delivered in 1841. The 1831 order was placed by the Stockton and Darlington Railway.

There followed a number of orders for the Stockton and Darlington Railway. They were great innovators - not always successfully - and their locos had many original features.

In 1838 two were built for the broad gauge Great Western Railway to the patent of T. E. Harrison, who later became the chief engineer for the North Eastern Railway. These could be viewed as the forerunners of the Garratt, with the boiler carried on a separate carriage to the cylinders and valvegear. However, the flexible steam coupling gave a great deal of trouble and they were withdrawn.

They continued to build more conventional engines, possibly under sub-contract, among them, three for the Birmingham and Derby Junction Railway. In 1850 the company built their first tank locomotive which was supplied to the York, Newcastle and Berwick Railway In the 1850s, they also built six 4-4-0ST, Crampton locomotives of the Sondes class for the East Kent Railway. These were soon withdrawn, and the Cramptons rebuilt into traditional 2-4-0 tanks.

In 1860, eight tender locomotives with a 0-4-2 wheel arrangement, the first tender locomotives to work in South Africa, were built for the Cape Town Railway and Dock Company.

In 1870, they built St. Peter's Works adjoining that of Robert Stephenson and Company and in 1880 amalgamated with the shipbuilder A. Leslie and Company, to become Hawthorn Leslie and Company.

Hawthorns and Company, Leith
In 1846, they bought the Leith Engine Works, in Leith, Scotland, for the assembly of locomotives prepared in Newcastle. These works were sold to another company also called Hawthorns and Company, which produced some four hundred locomotives on its own account until 1872.

In 1859, Hawthorns, Leith, built an 0-4-0T locomotive for Messrs E. & J. Pickering, contractors for the construction of the Cape Town-Wellington Railway in the Cape Colony. This locomotive was the first steam locomotive to run in South Africa. In 1861 the Cape Town-Wellington Railway Company took over all construction, and the locomotive, from Pickerings and the locomotive became the Cape Town-Wellington Railway's no 9, later to become known as "Blackie". It was subsequently rebuilt to a  configuration. In 1936 it was proclaimed a national monument and has since been plinthed in the concourse at Cape Town station. 

In 1861, Hawthorns supplied an 0-4-0WT locomotive, works number 244, to the Howe Bridge Colliery in Lancashire. Named Ellesmere, it continued in use at the colliery until 1957, when it was the oldest working steam engine in Britain. It is now preserved in the National Museum of Scotland in Edinburgh.

Notes and references

Bradley, D.L. (1979) The locomotive history of the London Chatham and Dover Railway, Railway Correspondence and Travel Society.
 Lowe, J.W., (1989) British Steam Locomotive Builders, Guild Publishing.
 Clarke, J.F., (1977) Power on Land & Sea - a history of R & W Hawthorn Leslie, Hawthorn Leslie (Engineers) Ltd.

Hawthorn
Manufacturing companies based in Newcastle upon Tyne
 
Engineering companies of Scotland